"Provenza" (Spanish for "Provence") is a song by Colombian singer-songwriter Karol G. The song was released on April 21, 2022 through Universal Music Latino, as the lead single from her fourth studio album, Mañana Será Bonito.

Background 
The song was announced on April 19, 2022 through Karol G’s social media platforms with the title, release date and a clip of the music video. The song was released on April 21, 2022.

Composition 
"Provenza" is written in the key of D♭ major, with a moderately fast tempo of 111 beats per minute.

Critical reception 
Jessica Roiz from Billboard stated: "From its feel-good melody to its lyrics full of fresh air and freedom, the lilting, calypso-esque dance beat is a whole vibe."

Commercial performance 
"Provenza" debuted at number 36 on the US Billboard Hot 100 chart dated May 7, 2022. It became the highest debut for a Spanish song by a female artist on the chart's history. The following week the song reached its peak at number 25 on the chart dated May 14, 2022. The song became the highest charting Spanish song by a female soloist on the Billboard Hot 100 chart history, tied with Telepatía by Kali Uchis.

On the US Billboard Hot Latin Songs chart dated May 7, 2022 the song debuted at number 2, becoming Giraldo's highest peaking song as a soloist on the chart. The following week the song reached the top spot on the chart dated May 14, 2022, becoming her first number 1 song as a soloist on the chart and fifth overall. 

On the Billboard Global 200 the song debuted at number 15 on the chart dated May 7, 2022. The following week the song reached its peak at number 6. It became Giraldo's highest peaking song as a soloist.

Awards and nominations

Music video 
The music video for "Provenza" was directed by Pedro Artola and was released on Karol G's YouTube channel on April 21, 2022. The music video takes place throughout the island of Lanzarote.

Live performances 
Giraldo performed the song live for the first time at the Coachella Valley Music and Arts Festival on April 24, 2022 and second time on April 25, 2022.

Charts

Weekly charts

Year-end charts

Certifications

Release history

References 

2022 singles
2022 songs
Karol G songs
Spanish-language songs
Universal Music Latino singles
Songs written by Karol G
Song recordings produced by Ovy on the Drums